Chetput Ramaswami Iyer Pattabhiraman (11 November 1906 – 19 June 2001) was an Indian lawyer and politician from the Indian National Congress. He was the eldest son of Indian statesman C. P. Ramaswami Iyer. He served as a Member of Indian Parliament from Kumbakonam from 1957 to 1967 and as a Union Minister from 1966 to 1967.

Early life and education 

Pattabhiraman was born on 11 November 1906 to C. P. Ramaswami Iyer and his wife Seethamma. As Pattabhiraman was born after a Naga Prathistha yagna or a sacrifice to the Hindu god Nāga by Seethamma who had earlier suffered two miscarriages, Pattabhiraman was initially named Nagarajan. He was born a day before his father's 27th birthday.

Pattabhiraman had his schooling from the P. S. Higher Secondary School, Mylapore, Madras and graduated from Presidency College, Madras. He did his LL. B at the London School of Economics and Political Science and qualified for the bar from the Middle Temple in 1932. Pattabhiraman practised as an advocate after his graduation and in 1938, became an advocate of the Federal Court, Delhi, now the Supreme Court of India.

Politics 

Pattabhiraman was a member of the Indian National Congress from his early days. He participated in the boycott of the Simon Commission and the activities of the India League. He was elected to the Lok Sabha in 1957 and 1962 from Kumbakonam. In May 1962, Pattabhiraman was appointed Deputy Minister for Labour, Employment and Planning by the then Prime Minister Jawaharlal Nehru and served as the Deputy Minister for Information and Broadcasting from 15 June 1964 to 24 January 1966. He also served as a Minister for Law and Company Affairs from 25 January 1966 till his resignation in 1967. Pattabhiraman lost the 1967 elections from Kumbakonam and retired from politics.

Sports 

Pattabhiraman was an excellent sportsman and a patron of sporting championships. He established the Mylapore Recreation Club and along with P. Subbarayan, founded the Madras Cricket Association.

Death 

Pattabhiraman died in his sleep on 19 June 2001 at the age of 94.

Family 

Pattabhiraman's father, Sir C. P. Ramaswami Iyer was one of India's front ranking statesman and at the time of his birth, the lawyer with the highest income in India. On 26 January 1925, Pattabhiraman married Saraswathi, the daughter of Captain Dr. P. Krishnaswami, Principal of Stanley College, Madras and niece of Pennathur Subramania Iyer, founder of P. S. High School. The couple had four daughters - Shakunthala (1927-2000), Seetha (1933-1958), Lakshmi and Padmini.

Notes

References 

 
 

1906 births
2001 deaths
Presidency College, Chennai alumni
Lok Sabha members from Tamil Nadu
Alumni of the London School of Economics
People from Thanjavur district
India MPs 1957–1962
India MPs 1962–1967